Fritillaria davidii is an Asian species of herbaceous plant in the lily family, native to Sichuan Province in China.

Fritillaria davidii is a bulb-forming perennial up to 30 cm tall. Flowers are nodding (hanging downward), bell-shaped, yellow with purple parkings.

The species is named for Père David (1826–1900), French missionary and amateur naturalist.

References

davidii
Flora of Sichuan
Plants described in 1887